Foz is a town in Galicia, Spain.

Foz may also refer to:

Places 
 Foz-Calanda, a town in Aragón, Spain
 Foz do Iguaçu, a city in Brazil

Other uses 
 Peter Forrest, an Australian cricketer nicknamed Foz
 Foz, a character in the British television soap opera Hollyoaks 
 Foz Cataratas Futebol Clube, a Brazilian football (soccer) club
 Subaru Forester